Ezekiel 18 is the eighteenth chapter of the Book of Ezekiel in the Hebrew Bible or the Old Testament of the Christian Bible. This book contains the prophecies attributed to the prophet/priest Ezekiel, and is one of the Books of the Prophets. In this chapter, Ezekiel "departs from the Priestly belief in the transgenerational consequences of sin and stresses the moral responsibility of [each] generation".

Text
The original text of this chapter is written in the Hebrew language. This chapter is divided into 32 verses.

Textual witnesses
Some early manuscripts containing the text of this chapter in Hebrew are of the Masoretic Text tradition, which includes the Codex Cairensis (895), the Petersburg Codex of the Prophets (916), Aleppo Codex (10th century), Codex Leningradensis (1008).

There is also a translation into Koine Greek known as the Septuagint, made in the last few centuries BC. Extant ancient manuscripts of the Septuagint version include Codex Vaticanus (B; B; 4th century), Codex Alexandrinus (A; A; 5th century) and Codex Marchalianus (Q; Q; 6th century).

Verse 2

The New King James Version calls this a "false proverb", while biblical commentator Albert Barnes calls it "a paganish saying".

Verse 4

 "Soul" (Hebrew: חידה ): the Hebrew word has a meaning of "enigmatic statements that require further interpretation", "allegorical and figurative", "dark, obscure utterance".
 "Parable" (Hebrew: משל ): "similitude" which is generally used in proverbs, generally form a comparison.

Verse 32

 "Turn" (Hebrew: השיבו hā-shî-ḇū, from the root verb שׁוּביבו ): the Hebrew word has a meaning of "turn back", "return, come or go back", "turn about", "be converted (as a sinner)."

See also

Israel
Sin
Usury
Related Bible parts: 2 Kings 24, 2 Chronicles 36, Isaiah 11, Jeremiah 52, Matthew 13

Notes

References

Bibliography
 

  

Matties, G. (1990), Ezekiel 18 and the Rhetoric of Moral Discourse, Society of Biblical Literature, SBL Dissertation Series, 126.

External links

Jewish
Ezekiel 18 Hebrew with Parallel English
Ezekiel 18 Hebrew with Rashi's Commentary

Christian
Ezekiel 18 English Translation with Parallel Latin Vulgate

18